The 1955 Segunda División Peruana, the second division of Peruvian football (soccer), was played by 10 teams. The tournament winner, Carlos Concha was promoted to the Primera División Peruana 1956.

Results

Standings

External links
 La Historia de la Segunda 1955

 

Peruvian Segunda División seasons
Peru2
2